Milton is a crater on Mercury. It has a diameter of 186 kilometers. Its name was adopted by the International Astronomical Union in 1976. Milton is named for the English poet John Milton, who lived from 1608 to 1674.

MESSENGER Views

References

Impact craters on Mercury